The 1970 Missouri Tigers football team was an American football team that represented the University of Missouri in the Big Eight Conference (Big 8) during the 1970 NCAA University Division football season. The team compiled a 5–6 record (3–4 against Big 8 opponents), finished in a tie for fourth place in the Big 8, and outscored opponents by a combined total of 243 to 223. Dan Devine was the head coach for the 13th of 13 seasons. The team played its home games at Memorial Stadium in Columbia, Missouri.

The team's statistical leaders included James Harrison with 702 rushing yards, Chuck Roper with 1,097 passing yards and 1,141 yards of total offense, John Henley with 481 receiving yards, and Jack Bastable with 60 points scored.

Schedule

References

Missouri
Missouri Tigers football seasons
Missouri Tigers football